Fireships is the 19th studio album by English singer and songwriter Peter Hammill.  Originally released in 1992, it was the first release on Hammill's own Fie! Records label.  It was reissued in remastered form in 2006.

The sleeve notes label the album "Number 1 in the BeCalm series", and its songs are generally at the gentler, more introspective end of Hammill's work.  Hammill's next album, the more rocking The Noise (1993), was similarly labelled as "Number 1 in the A Loud series".  Hammill decided to put the quiet and loud songs he had recently written and recorded on separate albums.

At around the same time, Virgin Records, the owners of Hammill's back catalogue on Charisma Records, were planning to issue a compilation of his earlier work.  When he explained the concept of the BeCalm and A Loud series to them, they decided to issue two compilations along similar lines - The Calm (After The Storm) (containing quieter songs) and The Storm (Before The Calm) (containing more aggressive material).

Originally, Hammill planned to continue this separation between quiet and loud music on subsequent albums, but the plan was soon abandoned.

Two of the album's tracks, "I Will Find You" and "Curtains", have become staples of Hammill's live set.

At the time of the album's release, Hammill (in a rare piece of merchandising) issued a limited edition of 500 numbered prints of the cover, signed by himself and the artist, Paul Ridout. The cover comprises an almost hidden ghost-like image of Hammill’s face.

Track listing
All tracks by Peter Hammill, except where noted.
"I Will Find You"
"Curtains"
"His Best Girl"
"Oasis"
"Incomplete Surrender"
"Fireships"
"Given Time"
"Reprise" (Hammill, David Lord)
"Gaia"

Personnel
Peter Hammill - voice, guitar, keyboards
David Lord - keyboards
David Jackson - saxophone, flute
Nic Potter - bass
Stuart Gordon - violin
John Ellis - guitar

Technical
David Lord - recording engineer, mixing (Crescent Studios, Bath)
Paul Ridout - artwork

References

Peter Hammill albums
1992 albums